Albon may refer to:

 Albon (surname)
 Albon (medication)
 Albon, Drôme, a commune of southeastern France
 Château d'Albon, a ruined castle in Albon, Drôme

See also 

 Albone (disambiguation)